Anant Vijay Joshi (born 25 October 1990) is an Indian television actor known for playing the titular role of Bhaskar Tripathi in ALTBalaji web–series Virgin Bhasskar.

Filmography

Films

Television

Web series

Short films

See also
 List of Indian actors
 List of Indian television actors

References

External links

Living people
Indian television actors
Indian male soap opera actors
21st-century Indian male actors
Indian male television actors
Male actors in Hindi television
People from Almora
Actors from Uttarakhand
1990 births